The 1980 Northern Illinois Huskies football team represented Northern Illinois University as a member of the Mid-American Conference (MAC) during 1980 NCAA Division I-A football season. Led by first-year head coach Bill Mallory, the Huskies compiled an overall record of 7–4 with a mark of 4–3 in conference play, tying for third place in the MAC. Northern Illinois played home games at Huskie Stadium in DeKalb, Illinois.

Schedule

References

Northern Illinois
Northern Illinois Huskies football seasons
Northern Illinois Huskies football